Phareas is a genus of skippers in the family Hesperiidae, within which it is placed in tribe Phocidini.

Species
The following species are recognised in the genus Phareas:
Phareas burnsi Grishin, 2013
Phareas coeleste Westwood, 1852

References

Natural History Museum Lepidoptera genus database

Eudaminae
Hesperiidae genera